Iridomyrmex anteroinclinus is a species of ant belonging to the genus Iridomyrmex. Described in 1993 by Shattuck, the Iridomyrmex anteroinclinus is native to Australia and has only been observed in Western Australia.

References

Iridomyrmex
Hymenoptera of Australia
Insects described in 1993